Leopoldo Nobili, born on 5 July 1784 in Trassilico (Toscana) and died on 22 August 1835 in Florence, was an Italian physicist who invented a number of instruments critical to investigating thermodynamics and electrochemistry.

Born Trassilico, Garfagnana, after attending the Military Academy of Modena he became an artillery officer. He was awarded the Légion d'honneur for his service in Napoleon's invasion of Russia.

In 1825 he developed the astatic galvanometer.

He worked with Macedonio Melloni on the thermomultiplier, a combination of thermopile and galvanometer, before being appointed professor of physics at the Reale Museo di Fisica e Storia Naturale (Royal Museum of Physics and Natural History) in Florence where he worked with Vincenzo Antinori on electromagnetic induction.

He was also credited with the discovery of 'Nobili's Rings'. "When a dilute solution of copper acetate is placed on a bright silverplate and a strip of zinc is touched to the silver beneath the copper, a series of rings of copper are formed by electrolysis around the zinc."

References

Works
 
 

1784 births
1835 deaths
People from Gallicano
19th-century Italian physicists